Chaconia may refer to:
 Warszewiczia coccinea, a flowering plant species
 Chaconia (fungus), a  rust fungus genus in the family Chaconiaceae